The icosian calculus is a non-commutative algebraic structure discovered by the Irish mathematician William Rowan Hamilton in 1856.
In modern terms, he gave a group presentation of the icosahedral rotation group by generators and relations.

Hamilton's discovery derived from his attempts to find an algebra of "triplets" or 3-tuples that he believed would reflect the three Cartesian axes. The symbols of the icosian calculus can be equated to moves between vertices on a dodecahedron. Hamilton's work in this area resulted indirectly in the terms Hamiltonian circuit and Hamiltonian path in graph theory. He also invented the icosian game as a means of illustrating and popularising his discovery.

Informal definition 

The algebra is based on three symbols that are each roots of unity, in that repeated application of any of them yields the value 1 after a particular number of steps. They are:

Hamilton also gives one other relation between the symbols:

(In modern terms this is the (2,3,5) triangle group.)

The operation is associative but not commutative. They generate a group of order 60, isomorphic to the group of rotations of a regular icosahedron or dodecahedron, and therefore to the alternating group of degree five.

Although the algebra exists as a purely abstract construction, it can be most easily visualised in terms of operations on the edges and vertices of a dodecahedron. Hamilton himself used a flattened dodecahedron as the basis for his instructional game.

The icosian symbol  equates to rotating the insect's current travel anti-clockwise around the end point. In our example this would mean changing the initial direction  to become .

Legacy 
The icosian calculus is one of the earliest examples of many mathematical ideas, including:
 presenting and studying a group by generators and relations;
 a triangle group, later generalized to Coxeter groups;
 visualization of a group by a graph, which led to combinatorial group theory and later geometric group theory;
 Hamiltonian circuits and Hamiltonian paths in graph theory;
 dessin d'enfant – see dessin d'enfant: history for details.

See also 
 Icosian

References 

Graph theory
Abstract algebra
Binary operations
Rotational symmetry
William Rowan Hamilton